The 2009 Copa Libertadores de Fútbol Femenino (officially Copa Santander Libertadores de Fútbol Femenino 2009) for sponsorship reasons) was the first edition of the Copa Libertadores Femenina, CONMEBOL's premier annual international women's club tournament. The competition was played in Santos, São Paulo and Guarujá, Brazil, from October 3 to October 18, 2009.

Santos defeated Universidad Autónoma 9–0 to win their first Copa Libertadores Femenina title.

Format 
The cup was played by ten teams: one from each CONMEBOL country. The ten teams were divided in two groups of five clubs each for the First Stage. The two best-placed teams of each group qualified to play the semifinal and the winners then played the final, while the losers played the third-place game.

Qualified teams

Venues

Round and draw dates 
The draw for the competition took place at Estádio Urbano Caldeira on September 6, 2009.

First stage 
The top two teams from each group advance to the Semifinals.

Group 1 
All Group 1 matches were played at Estádio Urbano Caldeira (better known as Vila Belmiro) in Santos.

Group 2 
Group 2 matches were played at Estádio Municipal Antônio Fernandes (Guarujá), Estádio Ulrico Mursa (Santos) and Estádio Urbano Caldeira (Santos).

Knockout stage

Semifinals

Third-place match

Final

Top goalscorers

References

External links 
 SITE OFICIAL

2009
2009 in women's association football
2009 in South American football
Lib
International club association football competitions hosted by Brazil
International women's association football competitions hosted by Brazil